Vannu Kandu Keezhadakki is a 1985 Indian Malayalam-language film, directed by Joshiy. It is a remake of the Hindi film Khubsoorat. The film stars M. G. Soman, Lakshmi and Nadhiya.

Plot

Cast 

 M. G. Soman as Mangalath Viswanatha Menon
 Lakshmi as Padmavathi (Menon's wife)
 Nadiya Moithu as Manju (Sridevi's younger sister)
 Shankar as Dr. Ravi (Menon & Padmavathi's third son)
 Lalu Alex as Rajan (Menon & Padmavathi's eldest son)
 Surekha as Geetha (Rajan's wife)
 Baby Shalini as Shalu mol (Rajan's daughter)
 Maniyanpilla Raju as Suresh (Menon & Padmavathi's second son)
 Rajalakshmi as Sridevi (Suresh's wife)
 Baiju as Tinku (Menon & Padmavathi's fourth son)
 Thilakan as Thrivikraman Pillai (Viswanatha Menon's friend)
 Jagathy Sreekumar as Warrier or Vakkachan
 Prathapachandran as Sridevi and Manju's Father
 Kunchan as Cassette shop boy

Soundtrack 
The music was composed by Shyam and the lyrics were written by Poovachal Khader.

References

External links 
 
 

1980s Malayalam-language films
1985 films
Films directed by Joshiy
Malayalam remakes of Hindi films